My Market Kitchen is an Australian cooking television series which debuted on Network Ten on 22 August 2016, currently hosted by Matt Sinclair, Laura Sharrad and Mike Reid. It was previously hosted by Emma Dean and Lynton Tapp from 2016 to 2018, then Elena Duggan and Khanh Ong for the 2019 series and Ben O'Donoghue for the 2020 series.

Presenters

References

External links 
My Market Kitchen HQ at Instagram
My Market Kitchen TV
My Market Kitchen - About Us

Network 10 original programming
Australian cooking television series
2016 Australian television series debuts